The JuristenZeitung (JZ) (German: Lawyer's Newspaper) is a German legal magazine. It was founded in 1951 as successor to the Süddeutsche Juristen-Zeitung. It is published fortnightly by Mohr Siebeck and counts as the most important German legal magazine. The headquarters of the magazine is in Tübingen.

References

External links
 

1951 establishments in West Germany
Biweekly magazines published in Germany
German-language magazines
Legal magazines
Magazines established in 1951
Mass media in Tübingen

German law journals